Barrows House may refer to:

Edward S. Barrows House, Davenport, Iowa, listed on the National Register of Historic Places in Scott County, Iowa
Barrows-Steadman Homestead, Fryeburg, Maine, listed on the National Register of Historic Places in Oxford, Maine

See also
Barrow House (disambiguation)